Dury may refer to:

Places
 Dury, Aisne, France
 Dury, Pas-de-Calais, France
 Dury, Somme, France
 Dury, Warmian-Masurian Voivodeship (north Poland)
 Dury, Shetland, a settlement in Nesting, Shetland, Scotland

People
 Baxter Dury (born 1971), British musician
 Graham Dury (born 1962), British cartoonist
 Guy Dury (1895–1976), English cricketer and British Army officer
 Ian Dury (1942–2000), English singer and songwriter
 John Dury (1596–1680), Scottish theologian

Other
 Dury Memorial, commemorating a 1918 battle during the Canada's Hundred Days period

See also
 Durie, a surname